Ramuni Minchina Ramudu is a 1975 Indian Telugu-language drama film, produced by M. S. Gopinath and N. Bhatkavatsalam under the Rajeswari Fine Arts banner and directed by M. S. Gopinath. It stars N. T. Rama Rao and Vanisri, with music composed by T. Chalapathi Rao. This film is remake of Hindi film Hum Dono.

Plot
Dr.Ramu (N. T. Rama Rao) a noble person works at a Govt Hospital and toils for the welfare of  destitute. Once he saves a beautiful girl Lakshmi (Vanisri) from a serious condition when Lakshmi's father Rayudu (Prabhakar Reddy) a multi-millionaire establishes a hospital and makes Ramu as chief to serve the public.  Ramu and Lakshmi love each  other. Now Rayudu moves with the marriage proposal when he denounces Ramu's sister Seeta (Pandari Bai) as a prostitute. Angered Ramu crosses swords with him when Seeta also claims it as true and begs pardon to Rayudu but Ramu stops her. After that, Seeta commits suicide, Lakshmi disputes with her father and exits the house, by the time, depressed Ramu leaves the city. Thereafter, Ramu joins in the Indian army where he gets acquaintance with Major Raghu (again N. T. Rama Rao), who resembles him. During the time of the war, Raghu takes a vow from Ramu if something happens requests him to reach his home as an alternative of him for the rescue of his old mother (S. Varalakshmi). At present, everyone assumes Raghu is dead, so, to fulfil the word given to him Ramu reaches his house. There, he is surprised to see his Lakshmi as Raghu's wife who married to fulfill her father's last wish. Ramu stays away from Lakshmi and protects her fidelity. Meanwhile, Ramu meets a dancer Latha (Srividya) who has been suffering in the hands of goons. Ramu protects and assures to espouse her. At the same time, she spots Ramu with Lakshmi and suspects his character but after knowing the truth she understands his greatness. Suddenly, Raghu returns alive losing a limb and gets furious looking at the closeness of Ramu and Lakshmi when Raghu tries to kill Ramu. But Lakshmi obstructs his way and explains him regarding Ramu's honesty & morality when Raghu understands his virtue of Ramu and apologizes. But Raghu is afraid to come before his mother because she could not withstand seeing him as a handicapped. Here Ramu and Lakshmi play an accident drama and takes her before Raghu. Finally, the movie ends on a happy note with the marriage of Ramu and Latha.

Cast
N. T. Rama Rao as Ramu & Raghu (Dual role)
Vanisri as Lakshmi
Jaggayya as Brigadier
Prabhakar Reddy as Rayudu
Allu Ramalingaiah as Raghu's maternal uncle
Dhulipala 
Nagesh as Chiranjeevi
Tyagaraju 
Pandari Bai as Ramu's sister
S. Varalakshmi as Raghu's mother
Srividya as Latha
Nirmalamma as Latha's mother

Soundtrack

Music composed by T. Chalapathi Rao.

References

Indian drama films
Films scored by T. Chalapathi Rao
Telugu remakes of Hindi films
1970s Telugu-language films